Duraj دوراج is a village in Badakhshan Province in north-eastern Afghanistan. It is located on the Darr-i-Kuf Ab River, in the vicinity of the Safid Khers mountains.

References

Populated places in Kuf Ab District